Lyudmila Stanislavovna Smirnova (born July 21, 1949, in Leningrad) is a retired pair skater who competed for the Soviet Union. With partner Andrei Suraikin, she is the 1972 Winter Olympic silver medalist. With her then-husband Alexei Ulanov, she is a two-time World silver medalist.

Career 
Smirnova began figure skating in 1955 and became a member of the USSR National Team in 1968. She trained in Leningrad at Spartak and competed initially with Suraikin. Smirnova and Suraikin were coached by Maya Belenkaya. They were the 2nd strongest Soviet pair behind Irina Rodnina and Alexei Ulanov, and placed second behind them at both the World and European Championships three times (1970–1972).

Smirnova and Ulanov, skating for rival teams, fell in love. The pairs decided to separate—a decision they made before the 1972 Games. Rodnina and Ulanov won the gold, and Smirnova and Suraikin the silver. Thereafter Smirnova began skating with Ulanov.

Smirnova and Ulanov competed for two seasons. They won silver medals at the 1973 World and European Championships. The next season, they won European bronze and World silver medals.

In 1972 Smirnova was awarded the Medal For Labour Heroism.

Personal life 
Smirnova and Ulanov married and later divorced after having two children, Nikolai Ulanov and Irina Ulanova. Their daughter, Irina Ulanova, is a former pair skater who skated with Alexander Smirnov, and Maxim Trankov for about three years.

Competitive highlights

Results
(with Suraikin)

With Ulanov

References

External links
 Smirnova and Suraikin profile
 Smirnova and Ulanov competition results

1949 births
Russian female pair skaters
Olympic figure skaters of the Soviet Union
Soviet female pair skaters
Figure skaters at the 1972 Winter Olympics
Olympic silver medalists for the Soviet Union
Spartak athletes
Living people
Heroes of Socialist Labour
Olympic medalists in figure skating
World Figure Skating Championships medalists
European Figure Skating Championships medalists
Medalists at the 1972 Winter Olympics
Universiade medalists in figure skating
Universiade gold medalists for the Soviet Union
Competitors at the 1970 Winter Universiade